Brian Meyer can refer to:

 Brian Meyer (baseball)
 Brian Meyer (politician)

See also
 Brian Myers (disambiguation)